Rachidi is a surname. Notable people with the name include:

Ahmed Rashidi, also known as Ahmed Errachid (born 1966), Moroccan extrajudicial prisoners of the United States
Farhad Rachidi (born 1962), Iranian-Swiss scientist
Hassan Rachidi (born 1957), Moroccan journalist and director of Al Jazeera in Morocco
Ibrahim Rachidi (born 1980), French footballer
Said Rachidi (born 1986), Moroccan boxer
Younès Rachidi (born 1986), Moroccan tennis player
Rodney Rachidi (born 2001), South African